Rise of the Phoenix may refer to:

Rise of the Phoenix (album), 2012 album by Before the Dawn
Rise of the Phoenix (video game), first released in 1993
Rize of the Fenix, 2012 album by Tenacious D
The Rise of the Phoenix, 2017 album by Chanté Moore
The Rise of Phoenixes, 2018 Chinese TV series
"Rise Like a Phoenix", 2014 song by Conchita Wurst
"Croennes, Rise of the Phoenix", 2020 book by Drake Fyre